Syria (SYR) competed at the 1993 Mediterranean Games in Languedoc-Roussillon, France. The medal tally was 11.

External links
 Mediterranean Games Athletics results at Gbrathletics.com
 1993 - AGDE LANGUEDOC-ROUSSILLON (FRA) at CIJM web site

Nations at the 1993 Mediterranean Games
1993
Mediterranean Games